Kundu is a common Bengali Hindu surname found in India and Bangladesh.

History

The surname Kundu is found in Bengal among Bengali Kayasthas. Historian Tej Ram Sharma mentions that the surname is "now confined to Kayasthas of Bengal" while referring to the names of Brahmins ending in such Kayastha surnames in the early inscriptions dating back to the Gupta period.

Bengalis

In Bengal, during the reign of the Gupta Empire beginning in the 4th century AD, when systematic and large-scale colonization by Aryan Kayasthas and Brahmins first took place, Kayasthas were brought over by the Guptas to help manage the affairs of state. During this period, the Kayasthas had not developed into a distinct caste, although the office of the Kayasthas (scribes) had been instituted before the beginning of the period, as evidenced from the contemporary smritis. Tej Ram Sharma, an Indian historian, says that

Notables
 Gopal Kundu, Indian scientist
 Nitun Kundu, Bangladeshi artist, sculptor and entrepreneur
 Ritam Kundu, Indian cricketer
 Soumendranath Kundu, Indian cricketer
 Suman Kundu, Indian wrestler

References

See also
Bengali Hindu surnames
Indian surnames
Kayastha